Jason Haynes (born 7 March 1981) is a Barbadian cricketer. He played in 34 first-class and 14 List A matches for the Barbados cricket team from 2002 to 2011.

See also
 List of Barbadian representative cricketers

References

External links
 

1981 births
Living people
Barbadian cricketers
Barbados cricketers